Grimaud may refer to:

Grimaud, Var, a town in France
Grimaud (company), a brand of French playing card
Grimoald (disambiguation), Grimaud being a variant
Hélène Grimaud (born 1969), pianist
 A character in Alexandre Dumas's The d'Artagnan Romances